Seeling is a surname. Notable people with the surname include:

Charlie Seeling (1883–1956), New Zealand rugby league and union player
Charlie Seeling Jr., New Zealand rugby league player and coach
Charles R. Seeling (1895–1951), American cinematographer, film producer and director
Heinrich Seeling (1852–1932), German architect